In the U.S. state of California, capital punishment is a legal penalty. However it is not allowed to be carried out  because executions were halted by an official moratorium ordered by Governor Gavin Newsom. Prior to the moratorium, executions were frozen by a federal court order since 2006, and the litigation resulting in the court order has been on hold since the promulgation of the moratorium. Thus, there will be a court-ordered moratorium on executions after the termination of Newsom's moratorium if capital punishment remains a legal penalty in California by then.

The state carried out 709 executions from 1778 until 1972 when the California Supreme Court struck down California's capital punishment statute in the case People v. Anderson. California voters reinstated the death penalty a few months later, with Proposition 17 legalizing the death penalty in the state constitution and ending the Anderson ruling. Since that ruling, there have been just 13 executions, yet hundreds of inmates have been sentenced. The last execution that took place in California was in 2006. Two people condemned in California (Kelvin Malone and Alfredo Prieto) have also been executed in Missouri and Virginia.

, official California Department of Corrections and Rehabilitation (CDCR) records show that there are 689 inmates awaiting execution in California, the lowest it has been since 2011, primarily due to suicide, death from other causes, fewer juries willing to sentence people to death, and resentencings by newly elected district attorneys, among other things. 21 of those on death row are females, held at the female death row in the Central California Women's Facility (CCWF) in Chowchilla, with the other 668 inmates awaiting execution being males that are housed throughout the state, although most males are housed in San Quentin State Prison.

California voters rejected two initiatives to repeal the death penalty by popular vote in 2012 and 2016, and they narrowly adopted in 2016 another proposal to expedite its appeal process. On August 26, 2021, the California Supreme Court upheld the state's death penalty rules.

History

Pre-Furman and pre-Anderson history
The first known death sentence in California was recorded in 1778. On April 6, 1778, four Kumeyaay chiefs from a Mission San Diego area ranchería were convicted of conspiring to kill Christians and were sentenced to death by José Francisco Ortega, Commandant of the Presidio of San Diego; the four were to be shot on April 11. However, there is some doubt whether the executions actually took place.

Four methods have been used historically for executions. Until slightly before California was admitted into the Union, executions were carried out by firing squad. Upon admission, the state adopted hanging as the method of choice.

The penal code was modified on February 14, 1872, to state that hangings were to take place inside the confines of the county jail or other private places. The only people allowed to be present were the county sheriff, a physician, and the county District Attorney, who would in addition select at least 12 "reputable citizens".  No more than two "ministers of the gospel" and no more than five people selected by the condemned could also be present.

Executions were moved to the state level in 1889 when the law was updated so that hangings would occur in one of the state prisons—San Quentin State Prison and Folsom State Prison. According to the California Department of Corrections, although the law did not require the trial judge to choose a specific prison, it was customary for recidivists to be sent to Folsom. Under these new laws, the first execution at San Quentin was Jose Gabriel on March 3, 1893, for murder. The first hanging at Folsom was Chin Hane, also for murder, on December 13, 1895. A total of 215 inmates were hanged at San Quentin and a total of 93 were hanged at Folsom.California adopted the gas chamber as its sole method in 1937 (though two more hangings took place for people already sentenced). The first people to die in the San Quentin gas chamber (the only one in the state) were Albert Kessell and Robert Lee Cannon on December 2, 1938. Three more people had their death sentences carried out within two weeks.  Up until 1967, 194 people were executed by lethal gas, including four women.  The last person was Aaron Mitchell on April 12, 1967.

In previous eras the California Institution for Women housed the death row for women.

1972 abolition of capital punishment
On April 24, 1972, the Supreme Court of California ruled in People v. Anderson that the state's current death penalty laws were unconstitutional. Justice Marshall F. McComb was the lone dissenter, arguing that the death penalty deterred crime, noting numerous Supreme Court precedents upholding the death penalty's constitutionality, and stating that the legislative and initiative processes were the only appropriate avenues to determine whether the death penalty should be allowed. The majority's decision spared the lives of 105 death row inmates, including Sirhan Sirhan (assassin of Robert F. Kennedy) and serial killer Charles Manson. McComb was so outraged by the decision that he walked out of the courtroom during its reading.

Following the ruling, the Constitution of California was modified to reinstate capital punishment under an initiative called Proposition 17. In 1973 a new statute was subsequently enacted, making the death penalty mandatory for a number of crimes including first degree murder in specific instances, kidnapping during which a victim dies, train wrecking during which a victim dies, treason against the state, and assault by a life prisoner if the victim dies within a year.

The debate over capital punishment played out in a somewhat similar fashion on the national level. On June 29, 1972, the United States Supreme Court issued its decision in Furman v. Georgia, resulting in a de facto moratorium on executions in the United States. On July 2, 1976, the Supreme Court, in Gregg v. Georgia, reviewing capital punishment laws enacted in response to its Furman decision, found constitutional those statutes that allowed a jury to impose the death penalty after consideration of both aggravating and mitigating circumstances. On the same date, the Court held that statutes imposing a mandatory death penalty were unconstitutional.

In a later decision in 1976, the Supreme Court of California again held the state's death penalty statute was unconstitutional as it did not allow the defendant to enter mitigating evidence. A further 70 prisoners had their sentences commuted following this. The next year, the statute was updated to deal with these issues. Life imprisonment without possibility of parole was also added as a punishment for capital offenses. A later change to the statute occurred in 1978 after Proposition 7 was enacted. This gave an automatic appeal to the Supreme Court of California, which would directly affirm or reverse the sentence and conviction without going through an intermediate appeal to the California Courts of Appeal.

In 1983, The State Bar of California created The California Appellate Project as a legal resource center to implement the constitutional right to counsel for indigent persons facing execution. At around the time of its founding, Michael Millman became the director of CAP. Millman served as director of CAP for 30 years. CAP oversees the efforts to assist private lawyers representing the more than 700 people on California's death row.

1986 retention elections 
On November 4, 1986, three members of the state supreme court were ousted from office by voters after a high-profile campaign that cited their categorical opposition to the death penalty.

This included chief justice Rose Bird, who was removed by a margin of 67 to 33 percent. She reviewed a total of 64 capital cases appealed to the court, in each instance issuing a decision overturning the death penalty that had been imposed at trial. She was joined in her decision to overturn by at least three other members of the court in 61 of those cases. This led Bird's critics to claim that she was substituting her own opinions and ideas for the laws and precedents upon which judicial decisions are supposed to be made.

Resumption of executions and introduction of lethal injection

On April 21, 1992, the state carried out its first execution since 1967 by putting to death Robert Alton Harris for the murders of two teenage boys in San Diego. A series of four stays of execution issued by the Ninth Circuit appeal court delayed the execution, causing the U.S. Supreme Court to intervene to vacate the stays and prohibit all other federal courts from any further intervention, ruling that the lower court decisions caused "abusive delays" and were "attempts to manipulate the judicial process".

The available methods were expanded to two in January 1993, with lethal gas as the standard but with lethal injection offered as a choice for the inmate. David Mason, the first inmate to have this choice, made no selection, so was executed by the lethal gas default in August 1993. Following a legal challenge and Ninth Circuit appeal court decision in 1996, lethal gas was suspended, with lethal injection becoming the only method. Serial killer William Bonin was the first person to be executed under these new laws, on February 23, 1996. Thirteen people have been executed in California since the death penalty was reinstated in 1977, though 162 other people have died on death row from other causes (30 of them from suicide) as of January 27, 2023.

Lethal injection litigation 

During the term of Arnold Schwarzenegger as governor, the state carried out two prominent executions in less than five weeks, with Stanley Tookie Williams in December 2005 and Clarence Ray Allen in January 2006.

A month later, in February 2006, U.S. District Court Judge Jeremy D. Fogel blocked the execution of convicted murderer Michael Morales because of a lawsuit against the lethal injection protocol. It was argued that if the three-drug lethal injection procedure were administered incorrectly, it could lead to suffering for the condemned, potentially constituting cruel and unusual punishment. The issue arose from an injunction made by the U.S. 9th Circuit Court of Appeals which held that an execution could only be carried out by a medical technician legally authorized to administer intravenous medications. The case led to a de facto moratorium of capital punishment in California as the state was unable to obtain the services of a licensed medical professional to carry out the execution.

When the state planned the execution of Albert Greenwood Brown in late 2010, Judge Fogel declined to issue a stay, citing the efforts the state made to comply with his earlier ruling. Nonetheless, the Ninth Circuit disagreed and vacated the judgment, further delaying executions in the state.

Studies 
The state supreme court proposed in 2007 that the state adopt a constitutional amendment allowing the assignment of capital appeals to the courts of appeal to alleviate the backlog of such cases.

Several victims' families testified to the California Commission on the Fair Administration of Justice in opposition to capital punishment, explaining that whilst they had suffered great losses, they did not view retribution as morally acceptable, and that the high cost of capital punishment was preventing the solving of cold cases.

But others who contest this argument said the greater cost of trials where the prosecution does seek the death penalty is offset by the savings from avoiding trial altogether in cases where the defendant pleads guilty to avoid the death penalty.

The California Commission on the Fair Administration of Justice in 2008 concluded after an extensive review that under the current death penalty system, death sentences are unlikely ever to be carried out (with extremely rare exceptions) because of a process "plagued with excessive delay" in the appointment of post-conviction counsel and a "severe backlog" in the California Supreme Court's review of death judgments. According to CCFAJ's report, the lapse of time from sentence of death to execution constitutes the longest delay of any death penalty state, and the Commission urged reform to expedite the appeal process.

Another study released in 2011 found that since 1978 capital punishment has cost California about $4 billion. A 2011 article by Arthur Alarcon, long-time judge of the Ninth Circuit Court of Appeal, and law professor Paula Mitchell, concluded that "since reinstating the death penalty in 1978, California taxpayers have spent roughly $4 billion to fund a dysfunctional death penalty system that has carried out no more than 13 executions."

Proposition 34, the SAFE California Act 

A coalition of death penalty opponents including law enforcement officials, murder victims' family members, and wrongly convicted people launched an initiative campaign for the "Savings, Accountability, and Full Enforcement for California Act," or SAFE California, in the 2011-2012 election cycle.  The measure, which became Proposition 34, would replace the death penalty with life imprisonment without the possibility of parole, require people sentenced to life in prison without the possibility of parole to work in order to pay restitution to victims' families, and allocate approximately $30 million per year for three years to police departments for the purpose of solving open murder and rape cases.  Supporters of the measure raised $6.5 million, dwarfing the $1 million raised by opponents of Proposition 34.

The proposition was defeated with 52% against and 48% in favor.

July 2014 and November 2015 federal decisions 
On July 16, 2014, federal judge Cormac J. Carney of the United States District Court ruled that California's death penalty system is unconstitutional because it is arbitrary and plagued with delay. The state has not executed a prisoner since 2006. The judge stated that the current system violates the Eighth Amendment's ban on cruel and unusual punishment by imposing a sentence that  "no rational jury or legislature could ever impose: life in prison, with the remote possibility of death."

However, on November 12, 2015, a panel of the U.S. Ninth Circuit Court of Appeals overturned the district court's ruling in a 3-0 published decision. The three judges held that the claim was not justiciable under federal habeas corpus.

2015 state lawsuit
In February 2015, Sacramento County Superior Court Judge Shelleyanne Chang ruled that state law compelled the Department of Corrections and Rehabilitation to develop a way to execute inmates by lethal injection. Later that year a new protocol providing a single-drug execution method was developed to comply with the ruling.

This was the result of a lawsuit brought by family members of murder victims. Supporters of capital punishment blamed the nearly three-year wait for a new protocol on "lack of political will" and attempt to render the death penalty "impractical and then argue for repeal on the grounds of practicality".

Propositions 62 and 66 

On November 8, 2016, California voted on two competing initiatives about capital punishment. Proposition 62 which, as Proposition 34, would have abolished the death penalty, was rejected by a 53-47 margin. The other initiative, Proposition 66, provides the streamlining of the capital appeal process, and also requires death-row offenders to work in jail and pay restitution to victims families, something they were previously exempted from. The measure passed 51–49. Its constitutionality was upheld 5-2 by the state supreme court on August 24, 2017, though the court held that one provision requiring it to decide direct appeals of capital cases within five years was directive rather than mandatory. The court ordered that Prop 66 take effect after this decision becomes final.

2019 moratorium on capital punishment
Governor Gavin Newsom promulgated Executive Order N-09-19 on March 13, 2019. Executive Order N-09-19 orders that:

The Executive Order granted everybody sentenced to death under California law a reprieve while also eliminating any mechanism that the state could use to execute an individual by repealing the lethal injection protocol adopted by the State of California. If the Executive Order was rescinded and all lawsuits challenging the use of capital punishment in the state are resolved executions would not resume immediately since the state would need to adopt a new execution protocol which requires time to do so. The Executive Order also closed the Death Chamber at San Quentin State Prison. The Death Chamber was subsequently dismantled by the California Department of Corrections and Rehabilitation. Although some pro-death penalty advocates have stated otherwise, no person sentenced to death in California was released or had their conviction or sentenced altered due to the promulgation of the Executive Order.

People v. McDaniel and possible striking down of capital punishment
Donte McDaniel, a condemned inmate, was sentenced to death in 2004 and has challenged his death sentence by challenging California's sentencing statutes that only require convictions to be proven beyond a reasonable doubt and to be unanimous but not requiring either for sentencing decisions. Therefore, under current law, a defendant needs to be found guilty by all jurors beyond a reasonable doubt but the jury does not need to be unanimous to find true any aggravating circumstances that makes one eligible to be sentenced to death, nor does the jury have to find those circumstances to be true beyond a reasonable doubt. If the Supreme Court of California rules in McDaniel's favor, hundreds of death sentences would be overturned and the court may strike down capital punishment in the state in its entireity. McDaniel has received the support of Governor Gavin Newsom along with the county district attorney's of Contra Costa, Los Angeles, San Francisco, San Joaquin, and Santa Clara counties, along with former Los Angeles County District Attorney Gil Garcetti in an amicus curiae brief filed with the court.

Proposed 2022 constitutional ban on capital punishment
On December 7, 2020, Assembly members Marc Levine (D-10) and David Chiu (D-17) introduced Assembly Constitutional Amendment 2 in the California State Legislature. The constitutional amendment would amend the constitution to prohibit the use of capital punishment as a punishment for any violations of law. The amendment is coauthored by Assembymembers Laura Friedman (D-43), Mike Gipson (D-64), and Mark Stone (D-29), along with state senator Scott Wiener (D-11). The resolution needs a 2/3 majority of each house of the Legislature before the resolution can be placed before the voters during the 2022 California elections. If more voters vote Yes than No on the question in 2022, the state constitution will be amended to prohibit the use of capital punishment in California as a punishment for any violations of law. The resolution failed to advance to the Assembly floor from the Assembly Committee on Public Safety.

2021 state Supreme Court ruling
On August 26, 2021, efforts to overhaul California's death penalty were weakened after the California state Supreme Court unanimously ruled that current state law provided little legal support for any overhaul in the case of People v McDaniel.

Current legislation

Legal process
When the prosecution seeks the death penalty, the sentence is decided by the judge and the jury must be unanimous.

In case of a hung jury during the penalty phase of the trial, a retrial happens before another jury. If the second or any subsequent jury is also deadlocked, the judge has discretion to order another retrial or impose a life sentence.

Under the state Constitution, the power of clemency belongs to the Governor of California. But if the offender was twice convicted of a felony, the governor can grant a commutation only on recommendation of the Supreme Court of California, with at least four judges concurring.

Executions are carried out by lethal injection, but an inmate sentenced before its adoption may elect to be executed by gas inhalation instead. If one of these two methods is held invalid, the state is required to use the other method.

Capital offenses
California has one of America's broadest lists of capital crimes and capital circumstances. The Penal Code provides for the possibility for a sentence of death for:

Of crimes against the person
first-degree murder with special circumstances
for financial gain (1)
the defendant had previously been convicted of first or second degree murder (2)
multiple murders (3)
committed using explosives (4); (6)
to avoid arrest or aiding in escaping custody (5)
the victim was an on-duty peace officer; federal law enforcement officer or agent; or firefighter (7); (8); (9)
the victim was a witness to a crime and the murder was committed to prevent them from testifying (10)
the victim was a prosecutor or assistant prosecutor; judge or former judge; elected or appointed official; juror; and the murder was in retaliation for the victim's official duties (11); (12); (13); (20)
the murder was "especially heinous, atrocious, or cruel, manifesting exceptional depravity" (14)
the murderer lay in wait for the victim (15)
the victim was intentionally killed because of their race, religion, nationality, or sexual orientation (a hate crime) (16)
the murder was committed during the committing of a robbery; kidnapping; rape; sodomy; performance of a lewd or lascivious act upon the person of a child under the age of 14 years; oral copulation; burglary; arson; train wrecking; mayhem; rape by instrument; carjacking; torture; poisoning (17)
the murder was intentional and involved the infliction of torture (18)
poisoning (19)
the murder was committed by discharging a firearm from a motor vehicle (21)
the defendant is an active member of a criminal street gang and was to further the activities of the gang (22)
train wrecking which leads to a person's death
fatal assault by a person under a life sentence, subject to the year and a day rule.
aiding, abetting, counseling, commanding, inducing, soliciting, requesting, or assisting in the commission of a felony enumerated in above in enhancement 17, with reckless indifference to human life and as a major participant, which results in a death, even if the defendant is not the actual killer.

Due to the amount of capital circumstances in California, almost every first-degree murder is punishable by death.

Of crimes against the state
treason against the state of California, defined as levying war against the state, adhering to its enemies, or giving them aid and comfort
perjury or subornation of perjury causing execution of an innocent person

Additionally, the Military and Veterans Code provides for possible capital punishment in either of the following if such act or acts, or failure to act, results in a death:
intentionally and maliciously destroying, impairing, injuring, interfering, or tampering with real or personal property with reasonable grounds to believe that such act will hinder, delay, or interfere with the preparation of the United States or any of the states from preparing for war, or any foreign nation which assistance by the United States is in connection with that nation's  defense; or
intentionally and maliciously making or causing to be made or intentionally and maliciously omitting to note on inspection any defect in any article or thing with reasonable grounds to believe that such article or thing is intended to be used in connection with the preparation of the United States or any state for defense or for war, or for the prosecution of war by the United States, or with the rendering of assistance by the United States to any other nation in connection with that nation's defense, or that such article or thing is one of a number of similar articles or things, some of which are intended so to be used.

Death row and execution chamber

Typical procedure

Men condemned to death in California must (with some exceptions) be held at San Quentin State Prison, while condemned women are held at Central California Women's Facility (CCWF) in Chowchilla. San Quentin also houses the state execution chamber. Women executed in California would be transported to San Quentin before being put to death.

Current statistics
, official California Department of Corrections and Rehabilitation (CDCR) records show 697 inmates sentenced to death in California, the lowest it has been since 2011, primarily due to suicide, death from other causes, fewer juries willing to sentence people to death, and resentencing's by newly elected progressive district attorneys, among other things. 23 of those on death row are women, held at the female death row in the Central California Women's Facility (CCWF) in Chowchilla.

Dismantling of death rows
On January 31, 2022, Governor Gavin Newsom announced that the current death row at San Quentin State Prison will be dismantled within two years and that the inmates housed at said facility will be transferred to other maximum security state prisons. In that time, the death row at San Quentin will be repurposed "into something innovative and anchored in rehabilitation,” according to corrections’ spokeswoman Vicky Waters. Inmates transferred will be required to work paid prison jobs, albeit that 70% of their wages will be withheld and designated as restitution to the families of the relevant victims. A pilot program that began in early 2020 has already removed 116 condemned men to other facilities. The women incarcerated at Chowchilla State Prison will also have the opportunity to move to less restrictive housing and work programs, with 8 of the 21 inmates there having done so already.

Racial makeup of death row
, Black people constitute a plurality of inmates sentenced to death, with 35.58% of inmates sentenced to death being Black. The second largest group of people sentenced to death are White (31.85%), while Hispanics/Mexicans are the third largest group of people sentenced to death (25.04%).

Criticisms
In 2008, the California Commission on the Fair Administration of Justice criticized the high number of aggravating factors as giving to local prosecutors too much discretion in picking cases where they believe capital punishment is warranted. The Commission proposed to reduce them to only five (multiple murders, torture murder, murder of a police officer, murder committed in jail, and murder related to another felony). Columnist Charles Lane went further, and proposed that murder related to a felony other than rape should no longer be a capital crime when there is only one victim killed.<ref>Charles Lane (2010), Stay of Execution: Saving the Death Penalty from Itself, Rowman & Littlefield Publishers, p.110-111</ref>

In 2021, the California Committee on Revision of Penal Code unanimously voted to recommend that the Legislature to abolish capital punishment in the state. A staff justified the vote by issuing a memorandum that states that "[e]liminating the death penalty is a critical step towards creating a fair and equitable justice system for all in California, as the ultimate punishment is plagued by legal, racial, bureaucratic, financial, geographic, and moral problems that have proven intractable."

In 2003, the Los Angeles Police Department arrested a young man Juan Catalan after a 16-year-old girl was shot dead. Catalan was sentenced to death after a witness stated that he looked like the killer. Catalan was exonerated when a documentary used footage from the taping of the HBO sitcom Curb Your Enthusiasm showing him seated at a Dodgers game at the time of the murder, thus confirming his alibi.

Public opinion
 
The Field Research Corporation found in February 2004 that when asked how they personally felt about capital punishment, 68% supported it and 31% opposed it (6% offered no opinion). This was a decrease from 72% support two years previous, and an increase from 63% in 2000. This poll was asked about the time that Kevin Cooper had his execution stayed hours before his scheduled death after 20 years on death row. When asked if they thought the death penalty was generally fair and free of error in California, 58% agreed and 32% disagreed (11% offered no opinion). When the results were broken down along ethnicity, of the people who identified themselves as African American, 57% disagreed that the death penalty was fair and free of error.

A poll in March 2012 found that "61% of registered voters from the state of California say they would vote to keep the death penalty, should a death penalty initiative appear on the November 2012 ballot" An August 2012 poll found that "support for Prop 34, which would repeal California's death penalty, fell from 45.5% to 35.9%."

A PPIC poll from September 2012 showed that 55% of all adults and 50% of likely voters prefer life in prison without the possibility of parole over the death penalty when given the choice.

A Field Poll in September 2014 showed that 56% support the death penalty, down from 69% three years earlier. Support for the death penalty in California had not been at this low a level since the mid-1960s.

A UC Berkeley Institute of Governmental Studies poll in 2019 found that 61% of California's registered voters supported the death penalty, with 39% opposed. However, this polls did not have an "undecided" option.

A UC Berkeley Institute of Governmental Studies poll in April 2021 found that 44% of California's registered voters supported a proposed 2022 constitutional amendment to abolish the death penalty, with 35% opposed and 21% undecided. 48% supported Governor Gavin Newsom's death penalty moratorium executive order, with 35% opposed. The poll found sharp racial and partisan divides on support for the death penalty in the state, with Democrats opposing it 63%-37% and Republicans supporting it 68%-32%. No party preference voters opposed it 43%-31%. Among registered voters, 54% of African-Americans, 46% of whites, 41% of Latinx, and 38% of Asian and Pacific Islanders supported abolition.

Statistics
Sentencing numbers by county
Number of death sentences per county . There are 703 inmates awaiting execution but there are 711 death sentences since some inmates have received multiple death sentences.

Ethnicity
Number of condemned per ethnicity .

Age range
Number of condemned per age .

Year received
List of the year when each one of the people currently on death row were received by the California Department of Corrections and Rehabilitation .

See also

List of people executed in California
List of death row inmates in California
Crime in California
Law of California
Capital punishment in the United StatesProcedure 769, witness to an executionLast Day of Freedom''

References

External links
 California Department of Corrections and Rehabilitation
 List of death row inmates
 Inmates Executed, 1893 to Present
 Capital Punishment Information
California execution chamber photos.
 Executions in California 1778–1967
 

1778 establishments in Alta California
1972 disestablishments in California
1973 establishments in California
California law
California law-related lists
 
California